The Quentin Collection is a moderate sized lifestyle center/shopping plaza located in Kildeer, Illinois. It is located directly across from Deer Park Town Center, but both are located in different towns (DPTC being located in Deer Park, Illinois). The center, which opened in Fall 2005, is home to a mix of big-box retailers, and upscale retailers.

Major retailers include Best Buy, DSW, Inc., Kirkland's, PetSmart, Stein Mart, Fresh Market, and Furniture Kidz.

Ownership
In September 2006, New York-based New Plan acquired The Quentin Collection from developer Zaremba Group Inc. of Lakewood, Ohio, for a reported sale price of US$27 million.

References

Shopping malls in Lake County, Illinois
Shopping malls established in 2005
2005 establishments in Illinois